Vescera may refer to:

Vescera (Ad Piscinam), former name of the Algerian city Biskra
Michael Vescera (born 1962), American heavy metal singer